"Until I Bleed Out" is a song by Canadian singer the Weeknd from his fourth studio album After Hours. It was released on March 20, 2020, alongside the rest of its parent album. A music video for the song was released on April 7, 2020. The Weeknd wrote and produced the song with Metro Boomin, Oneohtrix Point Never, Prince 85, and Notinbed.

Background and release
In early March 2020, two weeks before the release of After Hours, the Weeknd showcased the song during an album listening session to Variety writer Jem Aswad. The track was then officially released on March 20, 2020, alongside the rest of its parent album.

Lyrics
The song's lyrics refers to the conclusion of the Weeknd's relationship with his former partner through the usage of metaphorical violence. It signifies the Weeknd running out of blood in his body and no longer having the energy needed to keep the relationship alive.

Critical reception
The song was met with widespread universal acclaim, with Jon Caramanica from The New York Times describing it as being "the album's syrupy final song". J'na Jefferson from Billboard complimented the song's production, saying that "the video game-style instrumentals and the bleak echo near the high-end of the track ties the contrasting elements of the project in a neat bow." Praise for the track was primarily directed towards its dark atmosphere.

Music video
The official music video for "Until I Bleed Out" was first announced via the Weeknd's various social media platforms on April 6, 2020. Its release occurred the following day on April 7, 2020. Directed by Anton Tammi, the music video shows Tesfaye continuing the persona found throughout the era's promotional material and is seen navigating a balloon filled mansion in a lost, dazed, and damaged manner. The music video was met with a positive reception, with journalist noting its references to the Weeknd's early Trilogy material and comparing it to some films by Robert De Niro.

Commercial performance
Following the releasing of its parent album, "Until I Bleed Out" debuted at number 80 on the US Billboard Hot 100 dated April 4, 2020. It was the lowest charting track from After Hours.

Personnel
Credits adapted from Tidal. 
 The Weeknd – vocals, songwriting, production, keyboards, programming
 Metro Boomin – songwriting, production, keyboards, programming
 Oneohtrix Point Never – songwriting, production, keyboards, programming
 Prince 85 – songwriting, production, keyboards, programming
 Notinbed – songwriting, production, keyboards, programming
 Dave Kutch – mastering
 Kevin Peterson – mastering

Charts

Release history

References

External links
 

2020 songs
The Weeknd songs
Songs written by the Weeknd
Song recordings produced by the Weeknd
Songs written by Metro Boomin
Song recordings produced by Metro Boomin
Electro songs